Verkhnie Synovydne (former name, to 1946) is an urban-type settlement in Stryi Raion, Lviv Oblast, of  Western Ukraine. It belongs to Skole urban hromada, one of the hromadas of Ukraine. Verkhnie Synovydne was granted the status of urban-type settlement in 1957. Population: 

The settlement is located along the Opir River. It is a Ukrainian international highway (M-highway) connecting Kyiv to the Hungarian border near Chop, where it connects to the Hungarian Highway M34.

Its total area is 3.62 km2, and the population is around 3,348 people.
Local government is administered by Verkhnosynovydnenska settlement council.

The first written record of its mention dates from 1561. But archaeological studies indicate that in this location people lived in the days of Kievan Rus and  Principality of Galicia–Volhynia. That are approximately the year 1240.

Until 18 July 2020, Verkhnie Synovydne belonged to Skole Raion. The raion was abolished in July 2020 as part of the administrative reform of Ukraine, which reduced the number of raions of Lviv Oblast to seven. The area of Skole Raion was merged into Stryi Raion.

References

External links 
 weather.in.ua
 Верхнє Синьовидне .
 Населенні пункти Сколівського району  -  Верхнє Синьовидне

Literature 
 

Urban-type settlements in Stryi Raion
Populated places established in 1561